The Grinnell–Newburg Community School District is a rural public school district in Iowa that serves the cities of Grinnell and Oakland Acres, the unincorporated community of Newburg, as well as surrounding rural areas in western Poweshiek and far eastern Jasper counties.

Janet Stutz was hired as superintendent in 2016.

Schools
The district has a total of five school buildings, all of which are located in Grinnell.
Bailey Park Elementary, serving grades K–2
Fairview Elementary, serving pre-K and K–2
Davis Elementary, which serves 3rd and 4th grade students

Grinnell Community Middle School (5–8)
Grinnell Community High School (9–12)

The district formerly operated a school in Newburg.  The building is now privately owned.

The school's mascot is the Tiger. The school colors are orange and black.

Enrollment

Grinnell Community High School

Athletics
The Tigers compete in the Little Hawkeye Conference in the following sports:

Baseball
Basketball (boys and girls)
 Boys' - 1922 state champions
Bowling (boys and girls)
Cross country (boys and girls)
 Boys' - 1963 state champions
Football
Golf (boys and girls)
 Boys' - 1988 state champions
 Girls' - 6-time state champions (1977, 1983, 1991, 2001, 2002, 2003)
Soccer (boys and girls)
Softball
Swimming (boys and girls)
Tennis (boys and girls)
Track and field (boys and girls)
Volleyball
Wrestling

See also
List of school districts in Iowa
List of high schools in Iowa

References

External links
 Grinnell-Newburg Community Schools homepage

Education in Poweshiek County, Iowa
Education in Jasper County, Iowa
School districts in Iowa
School districts established in 1855
1855 establishments in Iowa